Faiz Muhammad (23 September 1937 – 29 October 2014) was a Pakistani freestyle wrestler. He was from 5 AK regt (HAIDER DIL BN). During his time, he was one of the  National Champions and Army Champions of Pakistan.

Early life and career
Muhammad was born in 1937 in the Kandi (Rajauri district area of Jammu and Kashmir) and migrated to Azad Kashmir after the partition of British India in 1947. His family settled Iin Khanpur village, present day Kotli District of Azad Kashmir. 

In June 1953, he was enlisted at training center number 3 of Azad Kashmir Regular Forces at Sohawa town (a village at that time). He had his first success in wrestling by winning the Pakistan Army Training Centres Wrestling Championship, an army-level competition. In the same year, he won the National and Army Wrestling Championships. He won the Army Championship every year from 1954 to 1984 and won several gold medals. At Pakistani national level, he is the only one who has this-record of Army Championships. From 1953 to 1986, he won the National Wrestling Championship for 33 years.

References

1937 births
2014 deaths
Olympic wrestlers of Pakistan
Wrestlers at the 1956 Summer Olympics
Wrestlers at the 1960 Summer Olympics
Wrestlers at the 1964 Summer Olympics
Pakistani male sport wrestlers
Asian Games medalists in wrestling
Wrestlers at the 1962 Asian Games
Commonwealth Games gold medallists for Pakistan
Wrestlers at the 1962 British Empire and Commonwealth Games
Wrestlers at the 1966 British Empire and Commonwealth Games
Wrestlers at the 1970 British Commonwealth Games
Commonwealth Games medallists in wrestling
Recipients of the Pride of Performance
Asian Games gold medalists for Pakistan
Medalists at the 1962 Asian Games
20th-century Pakistani people
Medallists at the 1962 British Empire and Commonwealth Games
Medallists at the 1966 British Empire and Commonwealth Games
Medallists at the 1970 British Commonwealth Games